Broten is a surname.

People with the surname include:
 Aaron Broten (born 1960), American hockey player
 Cam Broten (born 1978), Canadian politician
 Hans Broten (1916-1992), Canadian politician
 Laurel Broten, Canadian politician
 Neal Broten (born 1959), American hockey player
 Paul Broten (born 1965), American hockey player